The Foreign Emoluments Clause is a provision in Article I, Section 9, Clause 8 of the United States Constitution, that prohibits the federal government from granting titles of nobility, and restricts members of the federal government from receiving gifts, emoluments, offices or titles from foreign states and monarchies without the consent of the United States Congress. Also known as the Titles of Nobility Clause, it was designed to shield the federal officeholders of the United States against so-called "corrupting foreign influences". The clause is reinforced by the corresponding prohibition on state titles of nobility in Article I, Section 10, and more generally by the Republican Guarantee Clause in Article IV, Section 4.

Text

History
The Framers' intentions for this clause were twofold: to prevent a society of nobility from being established in the United States, and to protect the republican forms of government from being influenced by other governments. In Federalist No. 22, Alexander Hamilton stated, "One of the weak sides of republics, among their numerous advantages, is that they afford too easy an inlet to foreign corruption." Therefore, to counter this "foreign corruption" the delegates at the Constitutional Convention worded the clause in such a way as to act as a catch-all for any attempts by foreign governments to influence state or municipal policies through gifts or titles.

The Foreign Emoluments Clause is constitutionally unique in other respects. First, it is a "negative" clause—a restriction prohibiting the passage of legislation for a particular purpose.  Such restrictions are unusual in that the Constitution has been historically interpreted to reflect specific (i.e., "positive") sources of power, relinquished by the states in their otherwise sovereign capacities. Moreover, it is a negative clause without a positive converse. A common example of this is how the Commerce Clause represents the positive converse to the restrictions imposed by the Dormant (or "Negative") Commerce Clause. However, neither an express nor implied positive grant of authority exists as a balance against the restrictions imposed by the clause. For this reason, the clause was cited by Anti-Federalists who supported the adoption of a Bill of Rights.  Richard Henry Lee warned that such distinctions were inherently dangerous under accepted principles of statutory construction, which would inevitably "give many general undefined powers to congress" if left unchecked.

Why then by a negative clause, restrain congress from doing what it would have no power to do? This clause, then, must have no meaning, or imply, that were it omitted, congress would have the power in question, either upon the principle that some general words in the constitution may be so construed as to give it, or on the principle that congress possesses the powers not expressly reserved. But this clause was in the confederation, and is said to be introduced into the constitution from very great caution. Even a cautionary provision implies a doubt, at least, that it is necessary; and if so in this case, clearly it is also alike necessary in all similar ones. 

According to Lee, the true purpose of the clause was merely to protect popular tradition: "The fact appears to be, that the people in forming the confederation, and the convention ... acted naturally; they did not leave the point to be settled by general principles and logical inferences; but they settle the point in a few words, and all who read them at once understand them." It was argued, therefore, that a Bill of Rights was needed to safeguard against the expansion of federal power beyond such limited purpose(s).

Foreign emoluments
The prohibition against officers receiving a present or emolument is essentially an antibribery rule to prevent influence by a foreign power.  At the Virginia Ratifying Convention, Edmund Randolph, a delegate to the Constitutional Convention, identified the Clause as a key "provision against the danger ... of the president receiving emoluments from foreign powers."

The Department of Justice Office of Legal Counsel has opined that

The word "emolument" has a broad meaning.  At the time of the Founding, it meant "profit", "benefit", or "advantage" of any kind. Because of the "sweeping and unqualified" nature of the constitutional prohibition, and in light of the more sophisticated understanding of conflicts of interest that developed after the Richard Nixon presidency, most modern presidents have chosen to eliminate any risk of conflict of interest that may arise by choosing to vest their assets into a blind trust.  As the Office of Legal Counsel has advised, the Constitution is violated when the holder of an "Office of Profit or Trust", like the President, receives money from a partnership or similar entity in which he has a stake, and the amount he receives is "a function of the amount paid to the [entity] by the foreign government." This is because such a setup would allow the entity to "in effect be a conduit for that government", and so the government official would be exposed to possible "undue influence and corruption by [the] foreign government." The Department of Defense has expressly held that "this same rationale applies to distributions from limited liability corporations."

Presidential

Traditional treatment 
Foreign states often present the President of the United States with gifts. While President, George Washington received a painting of, and key to, the Bastille from the Marquis de Lafayette, as "a tribute Which I owe as A Son to My Adoptive father." After leaving office, Washington also took home to Mount Vernon a painting of Louis XIV that he had received as a gift from a French diplomat who had been his aide during the American war of independence. However, nothing is known about Washington's motivations, or whether he considered the emoluments clause to apply to either gift.

Post-Washington Presidents have traditionally sought permission from Congress to keep gifts. Absent permission, the President will deposit the object with the Department of State.  For example, Andrew Jackson sought permission from Congress to keep a gold medal presented by Simon Bolivar; Congress refused to grant consent, and so Jackson deposited the medal with the Department of State. Martin Van Buren and John Tyler received gifts from the Imam of Muscat, for which they received congressional authorization either to transfer them to the United States Government or to auction them with proceeds vesting to the United States Treasury.

Trump administration 
American politician and associate professor of law at Fordham University Zephyr Teachout has argued that the extensive business and real estate dealings of President Donald Trump, especially with respect to government agencies in other countries, may fall within the clause's scope, but Irish law lecturer Seth Barrett Tillman, of Maynooth University in Ireland, has written that the restriction may not apply to the president, based upon his reading of possible exceptions made during George Washington's administration. Tillman also wrote that "In order to ensure against ethical conflicts, both real and perceived, Trump should place his interests in those holdings beyond his personal control, i.e., into an independently managed blind trust. Such a move would be wise and consistent with America’s best political traditions and practices."

After China provisionally granted 38 "Trump" trademarks in March 2017, Democratic senators protested Trump's acceptance of the trademarks without congressional approval. In December 2018, there were reports of Saudi Arabia indirectly funneling funds to Donald Trump through Trump businesses, such as his hotels, that may be in breach of the Emoluments Clause.

The group Citizens for Responsibility and Ethics in Washington, including former White House lawyers Norm Eisen and Richard Painter, filed a lawsuit against Trump alleging violations of the clause, including the acceptance of the Chinese trademarks. One of these lawsuits, Blumenthal v. Trump, was dismissed on standing grounds by the United States Court of Appeals for the District of Columbia Circuit. Two other lawsuits, CREW v. Trump and D.C. and Maryland v. Trump, were dismissed as moot on January 25, 2021, by the Supreme Court vacating lower court  decisions that went against Trump, because he was no longer in office. The court's decision effectively ended all litigation against Trump on the emoluments issue.

Retired military
Under interpretations of the Emoluments Clause elaborated by the Comptroller General of the United States and the U.S. Department of Justice Office of Legal Counsel (but which have never been tested in court) retired military personnel are forbidden from receiving employment, consulting fees, gifts, travel expenses, honoraria, or salary from foreign governments without prior consent from Congress. Per section 908 of title 37 of the United States Code, this requires advance approval from the Secretary of State and the Secretary of the relevant branch of the Armed Services. Retired military officers have voiced concerns through the Retired Officers Association that applying the clause to them but not to retired civil service members is not an equal application of the clause, and therefore unconstitutional.

In 1942, Congress authorized members of the armed forces to accept any "decorations, orders, medals and emblems" offered by allied nations during the course of World War II or up to one year following its conclusion.  Notably, Gen. Dwight D. Eisenhower accepted a number of titles and awards pursuant to this authorization after the fall of Nazi Germany, including a knighthood in Denmark's highest order of chivalry, the Order of the Elephant.

Congress has also consented in advance to the receipt from foreign governments by officials of the United States government (including military personnel) of a variety of gifts, subject to a variety of conditions, in the Foreign Gifts and Decorations Act and section 108A of the Mutual Educational and Cultural Exchange Act, otherwise known as the Fulbright–Hays Act of 1961.  Under these rules numerous foreign decorations have been awarded to American military and civilian personnel, such as for diplomatic service or during the Vietnam and Gulf Wars.  Presidents Obama and Trump both received the Collar of the Order of Abdulaziz Al Saud from Saudi Arabia, a decoration frequently given to heads of state.

The New York Times has reported that, according to two defense officials, the Army is investigating whether Michael T. Flynn "received money from the Russian government during a trip he took to Moscow in 2015" while he was a government official. According to the officials, there was no record that Flynn has "filed the required paperwork for the trip", as required by the Emoluments Clause.

Titles of nobility
The issue of titles was of serious importance to the American Revolutionaries and the Framers of the Constitution. Some felt that titles of nobility had no place in an equal and just society because they clouded people's judgment. Thomas Paine, in a criticism on nobility in general, wrote:

He felt that titles blinded people from seeing the true character of a person by providing titled individuals a lustre. Many Americans connected titles with the corruption that they had experienced from Great Britain, while others, like Benjamin Franklin, did not have as negative a view of titles. He felt that if a title is ascending, that is, it is achieved through hard work during a person's lifetime, it is good because it encourages the title holder's posterity to aspire to achieve the same or greater title; however, Franklin commented, that if a title is descending, that is, it is passed down from the title holder to his posterity, then it is:

President's title
One of the first issues that the United States Senate dealt with was the title of president. Vice President John Adams called the senators' attention to this pressing procedural matter. Most senators were averse to calling the president anything that resembled the titles of European monarchs, yet John Adams proceeded to recommend the title: "His Highness, the President of the United States, and Protector of their Liberties," an attempt to imitate the titles of the British monarch: "By the Grace of God, of Great Britain, France and Ireland, King, Defender of the Faith, Prince-Elector of Hannover, Duke of Brunswick" and the French monarch: "By the Grace of God, Most Christian King of France and Navarre." Some senators favored "His Elective Majesty" or "His Excellency" (the latter of which would become the standard form of address for elected presidents of later republics). James Madison, a member of the House of Representatives, declared that the European titles were ill-suited for the "genius of the people" and "the nature of our Government". Washington became completely embarrassed with the topic and so the senators dropped it. From then on the president would simply be called the President of the United States or Mr. President, drawing a sharp distinction between American and European customs.

Under the rules of etiquette, the President, Vice President, members of both houses of Congress, governors of states, members of state legislatures, and mayors are accorded the title "The Honorable".

Internationally, the President is referred to as His Excellency.

Titles of Nobility Amendment

In 1810, Democratic–Republican Senator Philip Reed of Maryland introduced a Constitutional amendment expanding upon this clause's ban on titles of nobility. Under the terms of this amendment any United States citizen who accepted, claimed, received or retained any title of nobility from a foreign government would be stripped of their U.S. citizenship. After being approved by the Senate on April 27, 1810, by a vote of 19–5 and the House of Representatives on May 1, 1810, by a vote of 87–3, the amendment, titled "Article Thirteen", was sent to the state legislatures for ratification. On two occasions between 1812 and 1816 it was within two states of the number needed to become a valid part of the Constitution. As Congress did not set a time limit for its ratification, the amendment is still technically pending before the states. Currently, ratification by an additional 26 states would be necessary for this amendment to be adopted.

References

Further reading
 
 

Clauses of the United States Constitution